Laura Schenoneis an American writer. She is the author of three books and the recipient of the James Beard Award, which recognizes excellence in food writers and culinary professionals.

Early life 
Schenone was born in New Jersey, and grew up in Hackensack, New Jersey. She has degrees from Rutgers University and the City College of New York. From a young age she was interested in food and how foods taste.

Writing 
She started out her career as an editor and freelance journalist publishing in the Washington Post, The New York Times, and Saveur.

Schenone’s first book was A Thousand Years Over a Hot Stove: A History of American Women Told Through Food, Recipes, and Remembrances, (W.W. Norton 2004). This book won the James Beard Book Award The book contains classic recipes and tells the story of women’s history through food, from native women who fought the elements to feed their families, to moms who sold cookies to buy their children’s freedom, to immigrant women who cooked old foods in new homes.

Her next book was The Lost Ravioli Recipes of Hoboken: A Search for Food and Family about traveling to her family's ancestral region of Genoa on a quest to understand the mysteries of family, and the lost art of hand-rolled pasta.

Her third book was The Dogs of Avalon: The Race to Save Animals in Peril which is the story of Marion Fitzgibbon, an Irish woman and her odyssey to help abused, neglected, and abandoned animals, especially those abused by the Irish greyhound racing industry. Schenone learns of Fitzgibbon when she adopts Lily, an Irish greyhound, for her son who "needed a dog." The book expands to tell the story of  people who fight for all animals around the globe and asks the question of whether or not "All living creatures have a right to live and die with dignity."

Selected publications

References 

Living people
American women writers
Rutgers University alumni
City University of New York alumni
American food writers
James Beard Foundation Award winners
Year of birth missing (living people)